Epiphora may refer to:

 Epiphora (medicine), an excessive tear production usually a result from an irritation of the eye
 Epistrophe, also known as epiphora, the repetition of the same word or words at the end of successive phrases, clauses or sentences
 Epiphora (fungus), a fungus genus in the order Dothideomycetes
 Epiphora (moth), a moth genus in the family Saturniidae
 Epiphora, an orchid genus nowadays considered a synonym of Polystachya